Kevin Halabaku (born 29 November 2001) is a professional footballer who plays as a winger for Swiss club Sion. Born in Switzerland, he is a youth international for Kosovo.

Club career
Halabaku joined the youth academy of Sion at the age of 13. On 5 February 2021, he signed his first professional contract with the club until 2025. He made his senior and professional debut with Sion in a 2–0 Swiss Super League loss to Servette on 27 August 2022.

International career
Born in Switzerland, Halabaku is of Kosovan descent. He played for the Kosovo U19s in 2019.

References

External links
 
 SFL Profile

2001 births
Living people
Sportspeople from Valais
Kosovan men's footballers
Kosovo youth international footballers
Swiss men's footballers
Swiss people of Kosovan descent
Association football wingers
FC Sion players
Swiss Super League players